Autophila ligaminosa is a moth of the family Erebidae first described by Eduard Friedrich Eversmann in 1851. It is found from the Near East and Middle East to south-eastern Russia, the Balkans, Afghanistan, the United Arab Emirates and Oman.

There is one generation per year. Adults are on wing from May to July.

Subspecies
Autophila ligaminosa subligaminosa
Autophila ligaminosa ankara
Autophila ligaminosa rhodochroa
Autophila ligaminosa amianta

External links

Lepiforum e.V.

Toxocampina
Moths of Asia
Taxa named by Eduard Friedrich Eversmann
Moths described in 1851